Play is the fourth studio album by American country music singer David Ball. It was released in 1999 on Warner Bros. Records. The album produced the singles "Watching My Baby Not Come Back" (which Ball co-wrote with Brad Paisley) and "I Want To with You", which respectively reached numbers 47 and 67 on the Billboard country charts. Ball produced the album with Ben Fowler, except for "Watching My Baby Not Come Back", "Hasta Luego, My Love", "For You", and "When I Get Lonely", which were produced by Don Cook.

The track "What Do You Say to That" was also recorded by George Strait on his 1999 album Always Never the Same, from which it was released as a single. McBride & the Ride later recorded "Hasta Luego, My Love" under the title "Hasta Luego" on their 2002 album Amarillo Sky.

Track listing
"Watching My Baby Not Come Back" (David Ball, Brad Paisley) – 3:39
"I Want To with You" (Steve Bogard, Jeff Stevens) – 3:37
"What Do You Say to That" (Jim Lauderdale, Melba Montgomery) – 2:50
"Hasta Luego, My Love" (Tommy Lee James, Terry McBride, Jennifer Kimball) – 3:28
"A Grain of Salt" (Ball, Monty Criswell) – 3:11
"Lonely Town" (Ball) – 3:07
"Going Someplace to Forget" (Ball, Jim Weatherly) – 3:58
"For You" (Ball, George McCorkle) – 3:02
"I'm Just a Country Boy" (Ball, Dennis Morgan) – 4:00
"When I Get Lonely" (Ball, James House) – 3:12

Personnel
 Al Anderson - acoustic guitar, electric guitar
 David Ball - lead vocals
 Bruce Bouton - steel guitar, lap steel guitar
 Bob Britt - electric guitar
 Chris Carmichael - fiddle, background vocals
 Glen Caruba - percussion
 Mark Casstevens - acoustic guitar
 Joe Caverlee - background vocals
 Anthony Crawford - acoustic guitar
 Larry Franklin - fiddle
 Owen Hale - drums
 Wes Hightower - background vocals
 James House - acoustic guitar 
 John Barlow Jarvis - keyboards
 Wayne Killius - drums
 Liana Manis - background vocals
 Brent Mason - acoustic guitar, electric guitar, gut string guitar
 Steve Nathan - keyboards
 Al Perkins - dobro, steel guitar
 Alison Prestwood - bass guitar
 Tom Roady - percussion
 Robby Turner - steel guitar
 Pete Wasner - keyboards
 Dennis Wilson - background vocals
 Lonnie Wilson - drums
 Glenn Worf - bass guitar

Chart performance

References
Allmusic (see infobox)

David Ball (country singer) albums
Warner Records albums
1999 albums